Hypericum elegans is a species of flowering plant in the St. John's wort family Ericaceae. It is native to Europe.

The larvae of the moth Euspilapteryx auroguttella feed on H. elegans.

See also 
 List of Hypericum species

References 

 Species Plantarum 3(2):1469. 1802

External links 

elegans